Leicester Spring (2 September 1908 – 31 May 1997) was a New Zealand cricketer. He played three first-class matches for Auckland in 1936/37.

See also
 List of Auckland representative cricketers

References

External links
 

1908 births
1997 deaths
New Zealand cricketers
Auckland cricketers
People from Waipawa
Sportspeople from the Hawke's Bay Region